The 1998 international cricket season was from April 1998 to September 1998.

Season overview

May

Coca-Cola Triangular Series 1998

New Zealand in Sri Lanka

South Africa in England

June

Singer Akai Nidahas Trophy 1998

August

Emirates Triangular Tournament 1998

Sri Lanka in England

September

Sahara Cup 1998

References

 
1998 in cricket